The Double Event is a 1911 Australian feature-length film directed by W. J. Lincoln based on the first novel by Nat Gould, which had been adapted several times for the stage, notably by Bland Holt.

It was one of several films Lincoln made with the Tait family, who had produced The Story of the Kelly Gang.

It is considered a lost film.

Plot
Jack Drayton discovers his brother is an attempted murderer but won't expose him out of fear of ruining the family name. He leaves England in secrecy and starts a new life in Australia under the name of Jack Marston. He falls in love with Edith the daughter of a Sydney bookmaker, John Kingdon. He enters his horse, Caloola, in the Melbourne Cup and it wins, despite the attempts of evil Fletcher.

Fletcher later shoots a lady he is trying to blackmail and is chased across town but is eventually cornered in Chinatown and falls to his death. Jack marries Edith and returns to England.

Cast
The Bland Holt Company
Martyn Hagen

Production
The story was based on an 1891 novel by Nat Gould, The Double Event, or A Tale of the Melbourne Cup. This had been successfully adapted for the stage in Australia in 1893 by George Darrell and Bland Holt. Holt's company had disbanded in 1909 and his actors performed in the movie. Several scenes were shot at Flemington Racecourse in Melbourne.

Other scenes were shot at a studio in St Kilda. Assisting Lincoln was Sam Crew.

Release
The film was released in Melbourne on Caulfield Cup Day 1911. This up-to-date local production seems intended to educate the guileless in the ways of horses and the wiles of villains."

References

External links
 
The Double Event at AustLit
The Double Event at National Film and Sound Archive
Page on the book at Nat Gould's website

Australian black-and-white films
Australian silent feature films
Australian horse racing films
Lost Australian films
1911 films
1910s sports films
Films directed by W. J. Lincoln
1910s English-language films
1911 lost films
Lost sports films
Silent sports films